Sandy Crawford is an American banker and politician from the state of Missouri. A Republican, she represents the 28th District in the Missouri Senate, which encompasses all of Benton County, Cedar County, Dallas County, Henry County, Hickory County, Pettis County, Polk County, St. Clair County, and Vernon County. She was elected Senator in an August 2017 special election. Crawford previously served as the House Majority Whip, and in the Missouri House from 2010 to August 2017.

Personal life
Sandy Crawford was born October 1, 1957 in Buffalo, Missouri. She graduated from Buffalo High School in 1975, and married husband John in 1976. Ten years after high school Crawford began taking college classes at night while also working in the banking industry during the day, eventually earning a Bachelor of Science degree in Finance from Missouri State University in 1995. Later, in 1998, she would earn an advanced degree from the Graduate School of Banking at Colorado. When not involved with her legislative duties in Jefferson City, Crawford assists her husband John in running their livestock production operation (beef cattle).

Political career
Sandy Crawford was first elected to the Missouri House of Representatives in 2010. Previously her involvement in politics consisted of serving as Chairperson of the Dallas County (Missouri) Republican Central Committee. She defeated fellow Republican Warren Love by just under 1,400 votes to win the August, 2010 Primary. In the November, 2010 general election she won nearly sixty-six percent of the vote to defeat Democrat John L. Wilson and Constitution Party candidate Raymond Kish for the right to represent the 119th District in the Missouri House of Representatives.

Following the 2010 U.S. Census all Missouri House of Representative districts were reapportioned and district boundaries redrawn. Since Sandy Crawford's home was in the newly created 129th District, she ran for that House seat in 2012. In the August, 2012 Republican primary Crawford faced off with Randy Angst, who had represented the 146th District prior to the redrawn boundaries. Crawford was victorious in the primary with a bit over fifty-five percent of the ballots cast in her favor. The November general election again pitted Crawford against Democratic opponent John L. Wilson, who she soundly defeated in 2010. The margin of victory for Crawford was even larger in 2012, as she received nearly seventy-seven percent of all votes cast.

Legislative assignments
Soon after 97th General Assembly began their first session, Representative Crawford was elected to serve as House Majority Whip by fellow Republicans.  As Whip she serves on all House committees in an Ex-officio role. However she also serves on these specific committees:

 Agriculture Policy
 Appropriations - Infrastructure and Job Creation
 Ethics
 Financial Institutions
 Joint Committee on Government Accountability
 Leadership for Missouri Issue Development
 Missouri Sportsman Issue Development

References

1957 births
21st-century American politicians
21st-century American women politicians
American bankers
Farmers from Missouri
Living people
Republican Party members of the Missouri House of Representatives
Republican Party Missouri state senators
Missouri State University alumni
People from Buffalo, Missouri
Women state legislators in Missouri